The 2014–15 Second League (known as the Spor Toto 2. Lig for sponsorship reasons) is the third level in the Turkish football.

Teams 
Fethiyespor, 1461 Trabzon, TKİ Tavşanlı Linyitspor, and Kahramanmaraşspor A.Ş. relegated from PTT First League.
Giresunspor, Altınordu A.Ş., and Alanyaspor promoted to 2014–15 TFF First League.
Birlik Nakliyat Düzyurtspor, Fatih Karagümrükspor A.Ş., Hacettepe Spor, Keçiörengücü, Gölbaşıspor A.Ş., and Menemen Belediye Spor promoted from TFF Third League.
Çanakkale Dardanelspor, Gaziosmanpaşa, Çankırı Belediyespor, Eyüpspor, İstanbul Güngörenspor, and Bozüyükspor relegated to 2014–15 TFF Third League

Locations

White Group

League table

Results

Top goalscorers

Red Group

League table

Results

Top goalscorers

Promotion playoffs

Quarterfinals

First legs

Second legs

Semifinals

First legs

Second legs

Finals

See also 
 2014–15 Turkish Cup
 2014–15 Süper Lig
 2014–15 TFF First League
 2014–15 TFF Third League

References

External links
TFF 2.LIG

TFF Second League seasons
3
Turkey